Alejandro Sancho (born March 18, 1994) is an American Greco-Roman wrestler.

Sancho defeated former Olympian Ellis Coleman in the U.S. Olympic Trials to qualify for the 2020 Summer Olympics at 67 kg. He entered the Trials as the reigning World Team member, earning qualification for the weight at the 2020 Pan American Wrestling Olympic Qualification Tournament

Sancho is part of the U.S. Army World Class Athlete Program, holding a rank of Specialist.

References

External links

1994 births
Living people
American military Olympians
Place of birth missing (living people)
American male sport wrestlers
Pan American Wrestling Championships medalists
Sportspeople from Miami
Wrestlers at the 2020 Summer Olympics
U.S. Army World Class Athlete Program
Olympic wrestlers of the United States
20th-century American people
21st-century American people